Chris Compton is an American bridge player.

He is married to Donna Compton.

Bridge accomplishments

Awards
 Fishbein Trophy (1) 2016

Wins

 North American Bridge Championships (4)
 Jacoby Open Swiss Teams (1) 2008 
 Reisinger (1) 1989 
Von Zedtwitz Life Master Pairs (1) 2016
Roth Open Swiss Teams (1) 2016

Runners-up

 North American Bridge Championships (8)
 Keohane North American Swiss Teams (1) 1998 
 Mitchell Board-a-Match Teams (1) 1994 
 Roth Open Swiss Teams (2) 2014, 2017 
 Vanderbilt (2) 1986, 2005 
 Wernher Open Pairs (1) 1987 
Edgar Kaplan Blue Ribbon Pairs (1) 2018

Notes

American contract bridge players
Living people
Year of birth missing (living people)